
Gmina Grzegorzew is a rural gmina (administrative district) in Koło County, Greater Poland Voivodeship, in west-central Poland.

Villages
Gmina Grzegorzew contains the villages and settlements of Barłogi, Boguszyniec, Borysławice Kościelne, Borysławice Zamkowe, Bylice, Bylice-Kolonia, Grodna, Grzegorzew, Kiełczewek, Ladorudzek, Ponętów Dolny, Tarnówka and Zabłocie.

Neighbouring gminas
Gmina Grzegorzew is bordered by the gminas of Babiak, Dąbie, Kłodawa, Koło and Olszówka.

References
Polish official population figures 2006

Grzegorzew
Koło County